Paolo Visconti (died 1469) was a Roman Catholic prelate who served as Archbishop of Palermo (1469 –1473).

Biography
On 6 Sep 1469, Paolo Visconti was appointed by Pope Paul II as Archbishop of Palermo. He served as Archbishop of Palermo until his death in 1473.

References

External links and additional sources
 (for Chronology of Bishops) 
 (for Chronology of Bishops) 

1473 deaths
15th-century Italian Roman Catholic bishops
Bishops appointed by Pope Paul II